East Dorset District Council in Dorset, England existed from 1973 to 2019, when it was abolished and subsumed into Dorset Council.

Political control
From the first election to the council in 1973 until its abolition in 2019 political control of the council was held by the following parties:

Leadership
The leaders of the council from 1999 until the council's abolition in 2019 were:

Spencer Flower went on to be appointed leader of the replacement Dorset Council at its first meeting in May 2019.

Council elections
Summary of the council composition after recent council elections, click on the year for full details of each election. Boundary changes took place for the 2003 and 2015 elections.

1973 Wimborne District Council election
1976 Wimborne District Council election
1979 Wimborne District Council election
1983 Wimborne District Council election (New ward boundaries)
1987 Wimborne District Council election
1991 East Dorset District Council election

District result maps

By-election results
By-elections occur when seats become vacant between council elections. Below is a summary of recent by-elections; full by-election results can be found by clicking on the by-election name.

References

External links
East Dorset District Council